Amol Parashar is an Indian actor, best known for his versatile portrayals of popular characters across web shows and films. His most famous character is of Chitvan Sharma in the web series TVF Tripling and playing the legendary Indian Freedom Revolutionary Bhagat Singh in Shoojit Sircar's acclaimed Sardar Udham.

He has also starred in films like Dolly Kitty Aur Woh Chamakte Sitare opposite Konkona Sen Sharma, and Traffic opposite Manoj Bajpayee, Hindi remake of a Malayalam thriller film. Parashar was last seen in the comedy caper Cash in his first lead role, produced by Vishesh Bhatt.

Education 
Parashar graduated from Indian Institute of Technology Delhi as a Mechanical engineer and later quit his job at ZS Associates to join the arts.

Reception
Parashar's performance in Babloo Happy Hai was appreciated by the critics. The Times of India stated "Amol Parashar looks promising". The Sunday Indian said "Amol Parashar stands out". Boxofficeindia.com said "Amol Parashar brings out the sensitivity in his character and plays his part with doggedness".

Awards
1. Best Actor (Comedy) Award at News18 India's iReel Awards 2019 for TVF Tripling

2. Best Actor in a Comic role Award at IWM India Awards 2019 for TVF Tripling

3. Power Performer of the year at IWM India Awards 2019.

4. Most promising actor of the year by Iconic Achievers Awards 2019 by WBM Group.

5. Perfect Versatile Actor of 2020 at Perfect Achievers Awards by Perfect Woman Magazine.

6. Iconic Rising Star Actor of the year at Iconic Gold Awards 2021.

7. Industry No.1 Award for Films in 2022 by Herald Global.

8. Most Loved Actor on OTT 2022 by 9 Planets.

9. OTT Star of the year 2022 at the Celebrity Icon Awards presented by Governor of Maharashtra, Sh. Bhagat Singh Koshiyari.

TV commercials
Throughout his acting career, Parashar has been the face of many national and international brands. Some of those brands include Pepsi, Cadbury, Tanishq, Mentos, Wild Stone amongst many others.

Filmography

See also
 Anuj Tiwari

References

External links
 

Male actors in Hindi cinema
Living people
21st-century Indian male actors
Indian male film actors
Indian male television actors
1986 births